Bhupathiraju Vijayakumar Raju (born 17 September 1936) was a politician and industrialist. He was also the founder of Delta Paper Mills established in 1975, situated at Vendra Village, West Godavari Dist., Andhra Pradesh.

Political career
Vijayakumar Raju was a member of Bhimavaram Assembly Constituency in 1967 -72 as Independent and 1972 - 77 from Congress Party.

He was member of the 8th Lok Sabha, 9th Lok Sabha and 10th Lok Sabha of India. He was elected to Lok Sabha consecutively 3 times. He represents the Narasapur Lok Sabha Constituency of Andhra Pradesh and is a member of the Telugu Desam Party (TDP).

Bhupatiraju Vijaya Kumar Raju and other TD MPs defied the party whip and voted for P.V.Narasimha Rao to save the minority Congress government in 1992 for a good reason and in the process invited the wrath of N.T.Rama Rao.

References

See also
 Politics of Andhra Pradesh

1936 births
India MPs 1984–1989
India MPs 1989–1991
India MPs 1991–1996
People from West Godavari district
Telugu Desam Party politicians
Lok Sabha members from Andhra Pradesh
1994 deaths